The Finney Hotel, in Woodbury, Kentucky, is a historic I-house building built in 1890.  It was listed on the National Register of Historic Places (NRHP) in 1995.

It is located near the Green River in Woodbury Park, an  Butler County park, which is also home to two buildings that are NRHP-listed as U.S. Army Corps of Engineers Superintendent's House and Workmen's Office.

It is a two-story wood-frame building.  It has also been known as McKinney Hotel.  It was deemed "important from c.
1890-1931 because it illustrates the economic development of Woodbury as a turn-of-the-century river town. The hotel is the
only nineteenth century commercial building remaining in Woodbury."

References

National Register of Historic Places in Butler County, Kentucky
Hotel buildings completed in 1890
Hotel buildings on the National Register of Historic Places in Kentucky
1890 establishments in Kentucky
I-houses in Kentucky